Deliathis superba is a species of beetle in the family Cerambycidae. It was described by Franz in 1954, originally as D. superbus. It is known from Guatemala and El Salvador.

References

Lamiini
Beetles described in 1954